Ru Sang (also Romanized as Rū Sang; also known as Kalāteh-ye Rū Sang and Rui Sang) is a village in Jazin Rural District, in the Central District of Bajestan County, Razavi Khorasan Province, Iran. At the 2006 census, its population was 15, in 5 families.

References 

Populated places in Bajestan County